Lorenzo Romano (Bagno a Ripoli, 31 March 1989) is a retired Italian rugby union player. His usual position was Prop.

A former judoka, he won a silver medal at the 2005 European Cadet Judo Championships.

In the 2014–15 Pro12 season, he played for Zebre.

From 2011 to 2014, Romano was named in the Emerging Italy squad and he represented Italy on 2 occasions in 2012.

In 2009, he was also named in the Italy Under 20 squad.

References

External links
 
 Eurosport Profile

People from Bagno a Ripoli
Italian rugby union players
1989 births
Living people
Italy international rugby union players
Rugby union props
Sportspeople from the Metropolitan City of Florence
Zebre Parma players
Aironi players
Rugby Calvisano players
Italian judoka
Italian expatriate rugby union players
Italian expatriate sportspeople in England
Italian expatriate sportspeople in France
Expatriate rugby union players in England
Expatriate rugby union players in France
Saracens F.C. players
Wasps RFC players
CS Bourgoin-Jallieu players
Rugby Viadana players